Thang can refer to:

Places 
 Thắng, a township in Hiệp Hoà District, Bac Giang Province, Vietnam
 Thang, Ladakh, a village in Indian-administered Ladakh

Other 
 Thing in African-American Vernacular English
 Data Base Thang (DBT), a memory buffer structure in Berkeley DB interface

See also
 Our Thing (disambiguation)
 Thing (disambiguation)
 The Things (disambiguation)
 Thring, a surname
 Thwing (disambiguation)